Two ships of the Royal Navy have borne the name HMS Campbeltown, after Campbeltown in Scotland, with a third announced:

She was transferred to the Royal Navy as part of the 1940 Destroyers for Bases Agreement and was expended in the St Nazaire Raid in 1942.
  was a Type 22 frigate launched in 1987, decommissioned in 2011 and scrapped in 2013.
  will be a Type 31 frigate.

Battle Honours
 Atlantic 1941–42
 St Nazaire 1942

Royal Navy ship names